is a city located in Kagawa Prefecture, Japan.

Geography
Higashikagawa is located in far eastern Ehime Prefecture, on the island of Shikoku, facing the Seto Inland Sea to the north. The south borders Tokushima Prefecture through the Sanuki Mountains, which stretch from east to west. The city is located roughly halfway between Takamatsu City and Tokushima City.

Neighbouring municipalities 
Kagawa Prefecture
Sanuki
Tokushima Prefecture
Naruto
Awa
 Itano
  Kamiita

Climate
Higashikagawa has a humid subtropical climate (Köppen climate classification Cfa) with hot, humid summers, and cool winters. Some rain falls throughout the year, but the months from May to September have the heaviest rain.

Demographics
Per Japanese census data, the population of Higashikagawa in 2020 is 28,279 people. Higashikagawa has been conducting censuses since 1920.

History 
The area of Higashikagawa was part of ancient Sanuki Province. From the Heian period the Hiketa port prospered as a good natural harbor and a gateway to Shikoku from the Kinai region. From the Sengoku period, Hiketa Castle was a stronghold of the Ikoma clan and a castle town developed around the fortifications.  Even today, many of the intricate alleyways and old buildings from the Edo and Meiji periods still exist, preserving the atmosphere of a pre-modern fishing town. During the Edo Period, this area was part of the holdings of Takamatsu Domain. Following the Meiji restoration, the area was organized into villages within Ōchi District, Kagawa with the creation of the modern municipalities system on February 15,1890. Hiketa was elevated to town status on October 1, 1909. The city of Higashikagawa was the result of a merger on April 1, 2003 between Hiketa and the towns of Ōchi and Shirotori, both from  Ōkawa District (which was dissolved as a result of the merger).

Government
Higashikagawa has a mayor-council form of government with a directly elected mayor and a unicameral city council of 18 members. Higashikagawa contributes two members to the Ehime Prefectural Assembly. In terms of national politics, the city is within the Kagawa 2nd district of the lower house of the Diet of Japan.

Economy
Higashikagawa has a mixed economy centered on light manufacturing, commercial fishing and agriculture.  Traditionally, the city was noted for its production of gloves, claiming a 90% market share; however, due to labor costs, much of the market has been lost to China and southeast Asia. Another prominent industry is the manufacturing of bearings. JTEKT (formerly Koyo Seiko), one of the major companies of the Toyota Group, produces 25% of the global market share of tapered roller bearings. The former town of Hiketa is a center for producing wasanbon, a fine-grained sugar traditional to the region. In terms of fishing, Yellowtail was first successfully farmed here.

Education
Higashikagawa has two public elementary schools and two public middle schools operated by the city government, and one public high schools operated by the Ehime Prefectural Board of Education.

Transportation

Railways 
 JR Shikoku - Kōtoku Line
  -  -  -  -

Highways 
  Takamatsu Expressway

Local attractions
Hiketa Castle, where the Battle of Hiketa was fought in 1583, are in the eastern part of the city. 

Toramaru Puppet Land, a puppet theater, operates near Ōchi. Shirotori Zoo is the only zoo in Kagawa Prefecture.

Noted people from Higashikagawa 
Shizuko Kasagi, singer and actress
Kono Yasui, biologist, first woman Phd in Japan
Shōzō Fujii, Olympic gold medalist judoka
Yukiharu Yoshitaka, Olympic gold medalist judoka

References

External links

 Higashikagawa City official website 

Cities in Kagawa Prefecture
 
Port settlements in Japan
Populated coastal places in Japan